Survivor România is a Romanian reality game show based on the international Survivor format. The season premiered on 18 January 2020 on Kanal D.

Following the basic premise of other international versions of the format, it features a group of contestants who are marooned in an isolated location, where they must provide food, water, fire, and shelter for themselves. The contestants compete in challenges for rewards and immunity from elimination. The contestants are progressively eliminated from the game until only one remains and is given the title of "Sole Survivor" and awarded the grand prize. The first two seasons's "Sole Survivor" received the prize of €50.000. By the third season, the prize for the winner had been increased to €100.000.

Format and rules

The series follows the same general format as the other editions of the show. The players are split between two "tribes", are taken to a remote isolated location and are forced to live off the land with meager supplies for an extended period of time. Frequent physical and mental challenges are used to pit the teams against each other for rewards, such as food or luxuries, or for "immunity", forcing the other tribe to attend "Tribal Council", where they must vote off one of their players. Once about half the players are remaining, the tribes are merged but despite living on the same beach, tribes would still be split, competing against each other in challenges and fending for themselves, in a similar vein to the One World twist from the American version. The individual phase of the game occurred with 6 or 8 players left and challenges are on an individual basis; winning immunity prevents that player from being voted out. In every single season, individual phase feature "semi-finals" and "finals", and consisted of a great marathon of tests (physical and logical) involving elements used throughout the season.

Like other editions of the show, the Romanian edition has introduced numerous modifications or twists on the core rules to prevent players from over-relying on strategies that succeeded in prior seasons or other editions of the show. These changes have included tribe switches, hidden immunity idols and players being exiled or kidnapped from their tribe for a short period of time.

Differences in format
Unlike most versions of Survivor, with a maximum of one Reward Challenge before elimination, the Romanian version performs up to four Reward Challenges before the Immunity Challenge. Challenges pitted people in 1v1 (or sometimes 2v2 or 3v3) situations, with the winner gifting their team a point. Teams that reached 10 points first won the challenge (like a volleyball match).

Another difference in rules between Survivor România and other editions is how the unexpected eliminations are handled. On Survivor România, when a player is eliminated from the game outside of "Tribal Council" (either by being removed for medical reasons, or quitting), the player is replaced by a completely new contestant, who will take their place and the game continues as planned. 

Another difference in Romanian version is the public votes. Before the Tribal, members of the losing tribe fight each other for an Immunity Necklace. Also, in the Romanian version two Immunity Challenges are performed, these will decide the number of members of each tribe that will be nominated. Instead of the most voted person on the Tribal Council having to leave the competition, the tribe(s) votes to nominate one or two of its members. Then the winner(s), one male and one female of the Individual Immunity selects the last nominee from the tribe. Finally, the nominees face the public vote. The fans, through calls and texts, then chose the Survivor who should leave the game. This change required the game to be broadcast with minimal delay (usually 2 days) in order for the fans to vote in time. In the end, the public also vote for which player should be considered the "Sole Survivor" and be awarded the grand prize.

Survivor in Romania

The series first aired in 2009 on the Kanal D named Rătăciți în Panama (Lost in Panama). The series was filmed in Bocas del Toro, Panama and premiered on  September 28, 2009 featuring 18 players (nine men and nine women), divided into three tribes of six based on their occupations and degree of success in life and it was hosted by Andrei Gheorghe. In 2016, another edition aired on the Pro TV named Supraviețuitorul (Survivor). This series was announced by Pro TV on 23 December 2015 and was filmed in Caramoan, Camarines Sur, Philippines from June to July 2016. It aired from 12 September to 22 November 2016 on Pro TV. Hosted by Romanian journalist Dragoș Bucurenci, the program featured 18 Romanian castaways competing for 44 days. Both iterations of the series only lasted one season due to low ratings.

Kanal D (2020 - 2021)
After a 4-year hiatus on 13 November 2019, Kanal D, announced that it would be reviving the series in 2020. The series commenced airing on 18 January 2020. Unlike its predecessors, the show was renewed for another season and has continued to be successful since. On 29 December 2020, Dan Cruceru announced he would be stepping down as presenter after one season. Citing his reasons for leaving, Cruceru said flying back and forth to Dominican Republic "conflicted with [his] new projects" On 6 January, it was announced that former television presenter and swimmer Daniel Pavel would be his replacement. This premiere for this season was released on 9 January 2021.

Pro TV (2022)
In September 2021, it was reported that Pro TV Studios were in talks with Acun Medya, who own the rights to Survivor România, to revive the show in 2022. On 12 October 2021, Pro TV aired a teaser trailer, officially confirming that the series would return for a new series in 2022 on Pro TV. On September 29, 2022, Pro TV announced that Survivor România was given the green light to produce its fourth season in 2023.

Series overview

Broadcast and ratings 
Official ratings are taken from ARMA (Asociația Română pentru Măsurarea Audiențelor), the organisation that compiles audience measurement and television ratings in Romania.

Companion series

Survivor: ExtraShow
Introduced in season 3,  Survivor: ExtraShow is an aftershow that unpacks all of the castaway's strategies from the main show. The show premiered on Sunday 16 January 2022 on Voyo and airs weekly after each night episode of the main show. The first season is hosted by the winner of the second season of the show, Edmond Zannidache and gives the viewers an exclusive look into moments that occur on the island that aren't shown in the episodes, as well as moments from past seasons and  interviews with past contestants.

Awards and nominations

See also 
Expedition Robinson
Exathlon
Survivor (UK TV series)
Survivor BG
Survivor Philippines
Australian Survivor
Survivor South Africa
Survivor Srbija
Survivor Turkey
Sunt celebru, scoate-mă de aici!

References

External links
 Pro TV version
 Kanal D version

Romanian reality television series
Romania
2020 Romanian television seasons
Kanal D (Romania) original programming